Stephanie April "Steph" Twell (born 17 August 1989) is a British middle- and long-distance runner who competed at the 2008 Olympic Games in Beijing and the 2016 Olympic Games in Rio de Janeiro and trains at Aldershot, Farnham & District AC. She won the 1500 metres at the 2008 World Junior Championships, and is a three-time winner of the European Junior Cross Country Championships (2006–2008), as well as being part of four winning Great Britain teams. Representing Scotland, she won a bronze medal in the 1500 metres at the 2010 Commonwealth Games in Delhi.

Twell is currently sponsored by sports company Hoka One One and was previously sponsored by New Balance. She was coached by one of the nation's leading endurance coaches, Mick Woods, for 19 years, from 1998 to 2017. She is now self-coached.

Personal life
Twell was born in Colchester, England. Born and raised in England, Twell announced in 2009 that she would compete for Scotland rather than England, and represented Scotland at the 2010 and 2014 Commonwealth Games. She is eligible to compete for Scotland as her mother is from Paisley.  She married fellow runner Joe Morwood in the autumn of 2018. In May 2019, the couple broke the world record for the fastest 1 mile while holding hands.

Career
Twell's personal best time for the 1500 metres is 4:02.70, set in Barcelona, Spain on 1 August 2010. She competed in the women's 1500 metres at the 2008 Beijing Olympics and was eliminated in her heats running 4:06.68.

In September 2008, Twell was named European Athletics Rising Star of 2008. In January 2009 she was named "Telegraph Ten for 2012" – 10 of Britain's brightest young sports stars in The Daily Telegraph.

She began the 2009 cross country season well, winning at the Antrim International Cross Country. A few months later, Twell finished 38th in the 2009 World Cross Country Championships in Jordan. Although she was the fastest Briton in the race, she was disappointed with her performance and stated that she resolved to do better in the next championships.

She set a new personal best in the 5000 metres in May 2009, winning the Artur Takac Memorial in 15:18.47 – a meeting record.

She had a disappointing run at the 2009 European Team Championships over 3000 m, finishing in fourth in a time well outside her PB. At the 2009 World Championships she was never in contention in her heat at 1500 m and then when one of the favourites she was only 11th in the European Cross Country Championships (under 23 race).

Her 2010 was marked by improvements in her personal bests on the track. She set a 1500 metres best at the Weltklasse Zurich Diamond League meeting, finishing third and ahead of Lisa Dobriskey with a time of 4:02.54. Stepping up to the 5000 m at the Memorial van Damme in Brussels, she smashed her previous best by 22 seconds to set a new Scottish record of 14.54.08, breaking Yvonne Murray's 15-year-old mark. She ran at the Women's 5K Challenge in London in August 2010 and took third place behind Sylvia Kibet and Linet Masai. Reflecting on the race, she said: "To run 15:32 is great for me and third was just what I aimed for."
Twell suffered a fractured ankle competing in a cross-country race in Belgium in February 2011. A further foot injury in June 2012 ended her hopes of competing at the 2012 Summer Olympics.

Twell won the London 10,000 in 2018 and 2019.

Competition record

Circuit wins

Personal bests

All information (excluding 400m) taken from IAAF profile.

References

External links

1989 births
Living people
Sportspeople from Colchester
Scottish female middle-distance runners
British female middle-distance runners
Scottish female long-distance runners
British female long-distance runners
Scottish female cross country runners
British female cross country runners
Scottish female marathon runners
British female marathon runners
Olympic female middle-distance runners
Olympic athletes of Great Britain
Athletes (track and field) at the 2008 Summer Olympics
Athletes (track and field) at the 2016 Summer Olympics
Athletes (track and field) at the 2020 Summer Olympics
Commonwealth Games bronze medallists for Scotland
Commonwealth Games medallists in athletics
Athletes (track and field) at the 2010 Commonwealth Games
Athletes (track and field) at the 2014 Commonwealth Games
Athletes (track and field) at the 2018 Commonwealth Games
World Athletics Championships athletes for Great Britain
European Athletics Championships medalists
European Athletics Rising Star of the Year winners
British Athletics Championships winners
Medallists at the 2010 Commonwealth Games